Karoshi is a form of death from overwork especially prominent in Japan.

Karoshi may also refer to:

Karoshi, the former name of The Linux Schools Project, an operating system designed for schools
"Karoshi" (song), a 1994 song by Pitchblende
Karoshi (video game), a series of puzzle platform games